Statistics of JSL Cup in the 1984 season.

Overview
It was contested by 20 teams, and Yanmar Diesel won the championship.

Results

1st round
Nippon Kokan 2-0 All Nippon Airways
Yomiuri 4-2 Fujitsu
Nissan Motors 1-0 Toyota Motors
Furukawa Electric 1-1 (PK 3–2) Nippon Steel

2nd round
Yamaha Motors 0-1 Matsushita Electric
Nippon Kokan 0-2 Hitachi
Mazda 4-1 Yomiuri
Yanmar Diesel 3-1 Sumitomo Metals
Honda 3-0 Kofu
Nissan Motors 0-0 (PK 4–5) Mitsubishi Motors
Fujita Industries 0-2 Furukawa Electric
Toshiba 2-1 Tanabe Pharmaceuticals

Quarterfinals
Matsushita Electric 1-2 Hitachi
Mazda 0-3 Yanmar Diesel
Honda 2-0 Mitsubishi Motors
Furukawa Electric 0-1 Toshiba

Semifinals
Hitachi 2-2 (PK 3–4) Yanmar Diesel
Honda 0-1 Toshiba

Final
Yanmar Diesel 3-0 Toshiba
Yanmar Diesel won the cup

References
  

JSL Cup
League Cup